Works in Progress is a CD/DVD release from the band Kansas, bringing together songs from the last ten years (1992–2002) of the band's career, featuring music from Live at the Whisky, Freaks of Nature, and Device – Voice – Drum. In addition, the companion DVD collects a number of live performances originally featured on Live at the Whisky and Device – Voice – Drum. The title is a pun based on their progressive rock genre.

Track listing

CD
 "Mysteries & Mayhem" (from Live at the Whisky) - 8:25
 "Portrait (He Knew)" (from Live at the Whisky) - 5:38
 "Down the Road" (from Live at the Whisky) - 5:51
 "Black Fathom 4" (from Freaks of Nature) - 5:54
 "Freaks of Nature" (from Freaks of Nature) - 4:07
 "Under the Knife" (from Freaks of Nature) - 5:00
 "I Can Fly" (from Freaks of Nature) - 5:21
 "Peaceful and Warm" (from Freaks of Nature) - 6:47
 "The Wall" (from Always Never the Same) - 5:30
 "Cheyenne Anthem" (from Always Never the Same) - 7:30
 "Hold On" (from Always Never the Same) - 4:15
 "Dust in the Wind" (from Always Never the Same) - 3:57

DVD
 "Intro"
 "Belexes"
 "Icarus II"
 "Icarus I"
 "M & M"
 "Portrait"
 "Down the Road"
 "Hold On"
 "Dust in the Wind"

Personnel
Steve Walsh: lead vocals, keyboards
Billy Greer: bass guitar, backup vocals
Rich Williams: electric and acoustic guitars
David Ragsdale: violin on recordings from Freaks of Nature and Live at the Whisky
Phil Ehart: drums
Robby Steinhardt: violin, lead and backup vocals on recordings from Device – Voice – Drum and Always Never the Same
Greg Robert: keyboards and backup vocals on recordings from Freaks of Nature and Live at the Whisky

References

2006 greatest hits albums
Kansas (band) compilation albums
2006 video albums